The Columbus Condors are a former American professional basketball team based out of Columbus, Ohio, and a member of The Basketball League (TBL).

History
Columbus Condors were founded in 2016 by Darrell Miller and previously competed in the Central Basketball Association and  the Premier Basketball League (PBL).  On August 29, 2019, it was announced that the team would be joining TBL  for the 2020 season. 

On February 7, 2020  Otterbein University announced that they would host the Condors.

References 

Basketball teams in Ohio
Sports teams in Columbus, Ohio
2019 establishments in Ohio
Former The Basketball League teams
Basketball in Columbus, Ohio